Sir John Dudley Robert Tarleton Tilney,  (19 December 1907 – 26 April 1994) was a  British Conservative politician. He was Member of Parliament (MP) for Liverpool Wavertree from 1950 until his retirement at the February 1974 general election. He was Under-Secretary of State for Commonwealth Relations from 1962 to 1964.

He was the great grandson of the founder of RJ Tilney & Co. John Tilney was educated at Eton College. He was persuaded by John Brocklebank, the co-head of RJ Tilney & Co to begin with the firm in October 1928 before he had finished his degree course at Magdalen College, Oxford. He became a member of the Stock Exchange in December 1932 and was admitted to the partnership in April 1933.

Personal life
He was the second husband of Dame Guinevere Hunter Tilney, née Grant, DBE (born 8 September 1916 – died 4 April 1997), whose affiliations included:
Vice-President, National Council of Women of Great Britain (1958–61)
President, National Council of Women of Great Britain (1968–70)
UK Representative on United Nations Commission on Status of Women (1970–73)

References

External links
Liddell Hart Centre for Military Archives

Conservative Party (UK) MPs for English constituencies
UK MPs 1950–1951
UK MPs 1951–1955
UK MPs 1955–1959
UK MPs 1959–1964
UK MPs 1964–1966
UK MPs 1966–1970
UK MPs 1970–1974
Royal Artillery officers
1907 births
1994 deaths
People educated at Eton College
Alumni of Magdalen College, Oxford
Knights Bachelor
Businesspeople from Liverpool
Politicians from Liverpool
Place of birth missing
Place of death missing
Politicians awarded knighthoods
Ministers in the Macmillan and Douglas-Home governments, 1957–1964
20th-century English businesspeople